Robert Allen Mrosko  (born November 13, 1965) is a former American football tight end who played three seasons in the National Football League (NFL) with the Houston Oilers, New York Giants and Indianapolis Colts. He was drafted by the Oilers in the ninth round of the 1989 NFL Draft. Mrosko played college football at Pennsylvania State University and attended Wickliffe High School in Wickliffe, Ohio. He was a member of the New York Giants team that won Super Bowl XXV.

External links
Just Sports Stats
College stats
Fanbase profile

Living people
1965 births
Players of American football from Cleveland
American football tight ends
Penn State Nittany Lions football players
Houston Oilers players
New York Giants players
Indianapolis Colts players